Patcharin "Eve" Cheapchandej (born 13 December 1994) is a Thai tennis player.

Cheapchandej has a career-high singles ranking by the Women's Tennis Association (WTA) of 464, achieved on 24 September 2018. Her highest doubles ranking of No. 557 she reached on 18 September 2017. She has won three singles titles at tournaments of the ITF Women's Circuit.

Career overview
Cheapchandej made her Fed Cup debut for Thailand in 2018. She has a 4–2 record in international competition.

ITF finals

Singles: 3 (3 titles)

Doubles: 4 (4 runner-ups)

References

External links
 
 
 

1994 births
Living people
Patcharin Cheapchandej
Universiade medalists in tennis
Universiade silver medalists for Thailand
Universiade bronze medalists for Thailand
Southeast Asian Games medalists in tennis
Patcharin Cheapchandej
Medalists at the 2017 Summer Universiade
Competitors at the 2021 Southeast Asian Games
Patcharin Cheapchandej